Nipun Haggalla (born 13 November 1997) is a Sri Lankan cricketer. He made his first-class debut for Bloomfield Cricket and Athletic Club in the 2017–18 Premier League Tournament on 8 December 2017. He made his Twenty20 debut for Bloomfield Cricket and Athletic Club in the 2017–18 SLC Twenty20 Tournament on 24 February 2018. He made his List A debut for Bloomfield Cricket and Athletic Club in the 2018–19 Premier Limited Overs Tournament on 8 March 2019.

References

External links
 

1997 births
Living people
Sri Lankan cricketers
Bloomfield Cricket and Athletic Club cricketers
Place of birth missing (living people)